The Life and Adventures of John Vane, the Notorious Australian Bushranger is a 1910 Australian silent film about the bushranger John Vane, who was a member of Ben Hall's gang. It is considered a lost film.

Synopsis
The film starts with John Vane accepting a wager that he wouldn't bail up a Chinese man. Then Vane wins his bet by robbing a Chinese man, leading to headlines which say "Robbery Under Arms by John Vane" and Vane fleeing to the bush with his sweetheart. Later adventures include his capture and release of his sweetheart; the sticking up of the Keightley Homestead; the shooting of Michael Burke, which leads to Vane joining the Ben Hall gang; Vane's change of heart and surrender to Father McCarthy. He serves fifteen years in prison and after release retires comfortably.

The chapter headings were:
The beginning of a downward career
bailing up a Chinaman
His capture and release by his sweetheart
Michael Bourke horse stealing
The Reward for his Capture
Sticking up the Bank at Carcoar
Police Surprised by the Gang
"That's My Watch."
Sticking up at Bathurst
Police in Pursuit
The Bushranging Camp; the Warning
When Rogues Fall Out
Vane Joins Ben IHali for Raid on Keightley Homestead
The Bush ; the Gang's Demand
Next Morning; the Demand Satisfied
The Quarrel; Vane's Remorse and Farewell to the Gang
Notice of Reward
A Mother's Devotion
Surprised, and Surrender of Vane to Father McCarthy
Vane in the Hands of the Police on his Way for Trial
Sentenced to 15 Years
Six Years Elapse: Released for Good Conduct; Thank God, "Free."
Thirty Years Elapse; Vane Surrounded by his Family ; " Peace at Last."
" Often from Evil Cometh Good."
According to a contemporary report "the comic element is not forgotten, for the scene in which Vane is shown bailing up a Chinaman and discovers the booty hidden in the horse's tail, and the various intercits of the Celestial to avoid detection of the plant are not without their humorous side. Most attention however, is paid to the sensational."

Cast
 Jim Gerald
 Lance Vane
 Max Clifton
 Raymond Longford

Production
John Vane was the last surviving member of Ben Hall's gang. His memoirs had been published posthumously in 1908.

It was the first dramatic film from Charles Cozens Spencer who had established a production unit in June 1908 which made newsreels and scenic short films. This unit was headed by Ernest Higgins who shot John Vane. Raymond Longford reportedly features in a lead role.

Reception
The film was advertised as "Our Own Production". The critic from the Argus praised the "splendid backgrounds of the sunny New South Wales bush" and said the movie compares "very favourably with the best foreign films". The Evening News called it "a first-class piece of photographic art".

Box office response was popular throughout Australia. Although Spencer was purportedly dissatisfied with the final product, he went on to become a notable backer of early Australian movie production.

References

External links
 
 
 Complete text of original book at National Library of Australia

1910 films
1910 Western (genre) films
1910 lost films
Australian black-and-white films
Bushranger films
Lost Australian films
Lost Western (genre) films
Silent Australian Western (genre) films